Petteri Lampinen (born 5 February 1975) is a Finnish bandy player who plays for Russian side Rodina.  Petteri plays in defence and has gained three national champions medals whilst at Edsbyns IF.  Petteri plays for the Finnish national bandy team. He made his debut near the start of 21st century while he was still a Tornio PV player.

Clubs

External links
 
 

Finnish bandy players
Expatriate bandy players in Sweden
Expatriate bandy players in Russia
Living people
1972 births
Tornio PV players
Broberg/Söderhamn Bandy players
Edsbyns IF players
Dynamo Kazan players
Zorky Krasnogorsk players
Rodina Kirov players
Bandy World Championship-winning players